Ksawerówka  is a village in the administrative district of Gmina Fajsławice, within Krasnystaw County, Lublin Voivodeship, in eastern Poland.

The village has a population of 290.

References

Villages in Krasnystaw County